Curse the Traced Bird is the fourth album by Spires That in the Sunset Rise, released in 2008. It was released as a limited edition, and was recorded after Tracy Peterson left the group.

Track listing
"Black Earth" – 7:03
"Java Pop" – 4:43
"Party Favors" – 9:02
"Equus Haar" – 4:45
"Underscore" – 6:20
"Red Fall" – 6:44
"Pouring Mind" – 4:58

2008 albums